The Montenegrin mafia (Crnogorska mafija) refers to the various criminal organizations based in Montenegro or composed of Montenegrins. Outside of the country Montenegrin gangs are active throughout Europe-notably Serbia. The gangs tend to specialize in narcotics smuggling, tobacco smuggling and arms trafficking.

2021 Serious and Organized Crime Threat Assessment of Montenegro (SOCTA) identifies 10 high-risk organized crime groups in Montenegro, with Kavač and Škaljari clans being by far most prominent, and playing the central role in so called Balkan cartel. Most of the other high risk organized crime groups in Montenegro are either subservient to, or allied with one of two aforementioned Kotor clans. Major crime groups in Montenegro specialize in narcotics smuggling, although highly profitable cigarette smuggling is a focus of several criminal associations.

Kotor clans 

Kotor is a coastal town in Montenegro, which has a long maritime trade history, and is home to Montenegro's sole naval faculty. Thus, owing to the fact that most of Montenegro's educated merchant seamen come from Kotor, the city has emerged as a recruitment ground for sailors tasked with smuggling cocaine on cargo ships, on a South America - Europe route.

Kotor clan came to prominence during 2000s, the under the leadership of Darko Šarić and Dragan Dudić "Fric". This criminal organization was suspected of operating one of the largest cocaine smuggling schemes, on a South America - Europe route. They reinvested the proceeds from their criminal enterprise into numerous business ventures in Montenegro and the region, including high profile nightclubs and hotels. 

In 2010, Dragan Dudić was murdered in Kotor, while Šarić clan was largely neutralized in regional police action "Balkan Warrior". The remainder of Kotor clan has split into two factions - Kavač and Škaljari clans. These two organized crime groups are engaged in a bitter gang war since 2015, with as many as 50 dead on both sides, murdered in Montenegro and throughout Europe, usually in carefully planned targeted murders. 

The 2021 takedown of Sky ECC encrypted communication network has shed light on many previously unsolved crimes committed by the two clans, as well as on their connections with various Montenegro police and government officials. However, although Sky ECC takedown has weakened the clans, they remain the two most powerful criminal groups in Montenegro, and possibly in the Balkans. 

Both clans have offshoots and associates in countries of the Balkans region, as well as in rest of Europe -  Spain (major transit and unloading point for cocaine shipments, particularly Valencia, Balearic and Canary Islands), Italy (using Port of Gioia Tauro as a transit point of cocaine shipments, in cooperation with 'Ndrangheta), Austria, Netherlands, Germany, Belgium, Greece, Hungary, Ukraine and Turkey. Also, clans maintain a direct presence in South America, with ports in Brazil, Ecuador and Uruguay being identified as loading points for Montenegro cocaine smugglers.

Kavač clan  

Named after the Kotor village of Kavač, this clan is currently led by Radoje Zvicer. This clan is suspected to be close with remainder of Šarić clan, and Veljko Belivuk criminal group from Serbia. The clan also has a strong presence in Herceg Novi, Podgorica, Nikšić and Cetinje.

Šarić clan 

Šarić clan is an organized criminal group led by Darko Šarić, and operating from Pljevlja, Kotor and various other cities in Montenegro and Serbia. This group has held a dominant role in cocaine smuggling in the Balkans region, from the dismantling of Zemun clan in 2003, until the Balkan Warrior police operation in 2010. It has currently been reduced to an offshoot of Kavač clan.

Radulović clan 

Radulović clan is an organized criminal group operating from Nikšić, and led by Ranko Radulović, as well as by various members of his family. It is considered an offshoot of Kavač clan.

Bečići clan 

Bečići clan is an organized criminal group based in Bečići, a suburb of Budva. This clan is closely allied with Kavač clan, and is led by Vasilije Rafailović. It is unclear whether Bečići clan can be considered a separate criminal group, or an independent faction of Kavač clan.

Škaljari clan

Named after the Kotor village of Škaljari, this clan was led by Jovan Vukotić, until his murder in 2022. This clan is suspected to be close with Bar clan, as well as Zemun clan from Serbia. The clan has a strong presence in Bar, Budva, Cetinje and Podgorica. Škaljari clan is more horizontally organized, with looser ties between highly independent regional factions.

Budva clan 

Budva clan is an organized criminal group based in coastal Montenegrin city of Budva. This clan is closely allied with Škaljari clan, and is led by Marko Ljubiša "Kan" and Saša Boreta. It is unclear weather Budva clan can be considered a separate criminal group, or a highly independent faction of Škaljari clan.

Bar clan 

Bar clan is an organized criminal group based in coastal Montenegrin city of Bar. This clan is allied with Škaljari clan, and is organized in the horizontal manner - higher-ranked members are not necessarily coordinated by any leader, although lately the Bar mafia started regulating its vertical hierarchy making the organization much stronger. The organization has a local reputation to have connections with corrupt high-ranking men in Herceg Novi, Tivat, Kotor, Budva and Ulcinj Regional Police Units.

Berane clan 

Berane clan is an organized criminal group, operating out of northern Montenegro city of Berane, specialized in narcotics trade, and led by Vuk Vulević. 2021 Serious and Organised Crime Threat Assessment of Montenegro (SOCTA) classifies Berane clan as the third most powerful organized criminal group in Montenegro, although far from influence and power of Kavač and Škaljari clans.

Rožaje clan 

Rožaje clan is an organized criminal group based in northern Montenegro city of Rožaje, and specialized in heroin smuggling. This organized criminal group is allegedly led by Safet Kalić "Sajo", and has strong connections in Serbia, Bosnia and Herzegovina, Kosovo and Turkey. Notably, this criminal group has not been associated with violent crime, and its members and leaders have successfully evaded prosecution, despite being publicly designated as a serious organized criminal group for decades.

Drešaj clan 

Drešaj clan is an organized criminal group led by Leon Drešaj, and based in Tuzi. Composed mostly of ethnic Albanians, it is mostly involved in narcotics trade, and has strong connections in Albania and Kosovo.

Pink Panthers 

Pink Panthers are an international criminal group, specialized in jewelry heists. It is unknown whether Pink Panthers are sufficiently integrated and coordinated to be classified as a criminal group, however, many heists perpetrated by Montenegrin citizens worldwide have been attributed to Pink Panthers.

See also
 Crime in Montenegro

References

Further reading

External links 
 Montenegro, whole country controlled by Mafia

Mafia
Organized crime by ethnic or national origin
Transnational organized crime
Organized crime groups in Montenegro
Organized crime groups in Serbia